The 98th Specialized School or officially the Kyiv Specialized School No.98 with deep learning of English  is an ordinary public school which provides compulsory and specialized education.

See also 
 Kyiv Secondary School No. 189
 Kyiv Specialized School No. 159

References

External links
 https://web.archive.org/web/20141214011807/http://www.98.kiev.ua/

Educational institutions established in 1966
Schools in Kyiv